

hi-hm
Hi-Cor
Hibiclens
Hibistat
hilafilcon B (USAN)
hioxifilcon D (USAN)
Hippuran i 131
Hipputope
Hiprex
Hiserpia
Hispril
Histafed
Histalog
histapyrrodine (INN)
histidine (INN)
histrelin (INN)
Hivid
Hiwolfia
HMS® (medrysone)

ho-hu
hofocon A (USAN)
Homapin
homarylamine (INN)
homatropine methylbromide (INN)
homidium bromide (INN)
homochlorcyclizine (INN)
homofenazine (INN)
homopipramol (INN)
homosalate (INN)
homprenorphine (INN)
hopantenic acid (INN)
hoquizil (INN)
Humalog (Eli Lilly and Company)
HumaSPECT  (PerImmune, Inc.)
Humatin (Pfizer)
Humatrope (Eli Lilly and Company)
HuMax-CD4 (Genmab)
HuMax-EGFR (Genmab)
Humegon (Organon International)
Humorsol
Humulin (Eli Lilly and Company)
Huntexil (NeuroSearch)

hy
Hy-Pam "25"
Hy-Phen

hya-hyc
Hyalgan (Sanofi-Aventis) redirects to hyaluronan
hyalosidase (INN)
hyaluronidase (INN)
hybufocon A (USAN)
Hycamtin
Hycamtin (GlaxoSmithKline)
hycanthone (INN)
Hycodan
Hycomine

hyd

hyde
Hydeltra-TBA
Hydeltrasol
Hydergine

hydr

hydra-hydre
Hydra-Zide
hydracarbazine (INN)
hydralazine (INN)
Hydramine
Hydrap-ES
hydrargaphen (INN)
Hydrea® (hydroxycarbamide) (Bristol-Myers Squibb)

hydro
Hydro-D
Hydro-Reserp
Hydro-Ride
Hydro-Serp

hydrob-hydrot
hydrobentizide (INN)
Hydrocet
hydrochlorothiazide (INN)
hydrocodone (INN)
hydrocortamate (INN)
hydrocortisone aceponate (INN)
hydrocortisone (INN)
hydrocortone
Hydrodiuril
hydroflumethiazide (INN)
Hydrogenated ergot alkaloids
hydromadinone (INN)
hydromorphinol (INN)
hydromorphone (INN)
Hydromox R
Hydromox
Hydropane
Hydropres
Hydroserpine Plus (R-H-H)
hydrotalcite (INN)

hydrox
hydroxindasate (INN)
hydroxindasol (INN)
hydroxocobalamin (INN)
Hydroxomin
hydroxyamfetamine (INN)
hydroxycarbamide (INN)
hydroxychloroquine (INN)
hydroxydione sodium succinate (INN)
hydroxyethyl starch 130/0.4 (USAN)
hydroxypethidine (INN)
hydroxyprocaine (INN)
hydroxyprogesterone caproate (INN)
hydroxyprogesterone (INN)
hydroxypyridine tartrate (INN)
hydroxystenozole (INN)
hydroxystilbamidine (INN)
hydroxytetracaine (INN)
hydroxytoluic acid (INN)
hydroxyzine (INN)

hyg-hyz
Hygroton
Hylorel
hymecromone (INN)
hyoscine butylbromide
hyoscine hydrobromide
Hypaque
Hyperstat
Hyprotigen 5%
Hyserpin
Hytone
Hytrin
Hyzaar
Hyzyd